Heteroscleromorpha is a subclass of demosponges within the phylum Porifera.

References

 
Sponge subclasses
Taxa named by Nicole Boury-Esnault